Les Tuche is a 2011 French comedy film directed by Olivier Baroux. A sequel, Les Tuche 2, was released on 3 February 2016.

Plot
The Tuche family is the stereotypical unemployed lower class French family.

Jeff (the father) is the proud descendant of the unemployment welfare inventor, and has never worked a day in his life. Out of his 3 kids, the youngest one seems to be extremely intelligent. This will come in handy when all of a sudden, they win €100 million in the lottery, and will attempt to fit in the Monaco's upper class.

Cast
 Jean-Paul Rouve as Jeff Tuche
 Isabelle Nanty as Cathy Tuche
 Claire Nadeau as Grandma Suze
 Théo Fernandez as Donald Tuche
 Sarah Stern as Stéphanie Tuche
 Pierre Lottin as Wilfried Tuche
 Fadila Belkebla as Mouna
 Karina Testa as Salma
 Philippe Lefebvre as Bickard
 Jérôme Commandeur as Hermann
 Valérie Benguigui as Claudia
 Omar Sy as Bouzolles's monk
 Kad Merad as Bouzolles's fishmonger
 Pierre Bellemare as Bouzolles's mayor
 Olivier Baroux as Monnier

Remake
An Italian remake entitled Poveri ma ricchi was released in December 2016.

References

External links
 

2011 films
2011 comedy films
French comedy films
2010s French-language films
Films set in France
Films shot in France
Pathé films
Films directed by Olivier Baroux
2010s French films